The 1982 Hawaii gubernatorial election was Hawaii's seventh gubernatorial election.  The election was held on November 2, 1982, and resulted in a victory for the Democratic candidate, Governor George Ariyoshi over Frank Fasi, running as an Independent Democrat, and the Republican candidate, State Senator D. G. Anderson.  Ariyoshi received more votes than any other candidate in every county in the state.

Primaries
Primary elections were held on September 18, 1982.

Democratic Primary
Candidates and primary votes:
George Ariyoshi, governor: 53.87%
Jean Sadako King, lieutenant governor: 44.66%
Billy Kuaiwa: 0.57%
Frank DeCambra: 0.32%
John P. Fritz: 0.23%
Joseph Johns: 0.20%
Arthur F. Stebbing: 0.15%

Republican Primary
Candidates and primary votes:
D. G. Anderson, state senator: 96.79%
Jack J. Mahakian: 1.66%
Gabriel Juarez: 1.55%

General election

References

1982
1982 United States gubernatorial elections
1982 Hawaii elections